Bhargavi Davar is a noted mental health activist in India. She is the managing trustee of The Bapu Trust, an organisation that was founded in 1999 dedicated to the research and activism of mental health issues. She has written numerous articles in medical journals.

Bibliography
Mental Health from a Gender Perspective (2001, SAGE Publications)
Psychoanalysis as a Human Science: Beyond Foundationalism (1995, co-authored by Parameshwar R Bhat, SAGE Publications)
Mental Health of Indian Women (1999, SAGE Publications)
 Depression and the Use of Natural Healing Methods (2007). In: Peter Stastny & Peter Lehmann (Eds.), Alternatives Beyond Psychiatry (pp. 83–90). Berlin / Eugene / Shrewsbury: Peter Lehmann Publishing.  (UK),  (USA). (E-Book in 2021.)
 Depressionen und die Anwendung natürlicher Heilmethoden (2007). In: Peter Lehmann / Peter Stastny (Eds.): Statt Psychiatrie 2, Berlin / Eugene / Shrewsbury: Antipsychiatrieverlag, S. 83–92.  (E-Book in 2021)
Shodh: Psychiatry pallikadill vatancha (2019), co-edited with Peter Lehmann & Peter Stastny), Pune: BAPU Trust for Research on Mind & Discourse,

References

External links

Bhargavi Davar's article in Indian Journal of Medical Ethics

Indian medical writers
Mental health activists
Indian women science writers
Living people
Place of birth missing (living people)
Year of birth missing (living people)
Indian health activists